Basset (French bassette, from the Italian bassetta), also known as barbacole and hocca, is a gambling game using cards, that was considered one of the most polite. It was intended for persons of the highest rank because of the great losses or gains that might be accrued by players.

Basset in Italy
According to DELI (Dizionario etimologico della lingua italiana), the word Basetta is first recorded in the first half of the 15th century. The game Basset is described by a few authors as having been invented in 1593 by a noble Venetian named Pietro Cellini, who was punished with exile in Corsica for his contrivance. It may have been devised out of the game of Hocca, Hoca or even Hoc, considered the precursor and an outlawed form of Italian roulette at which people lost considerable sums of money and also an early iteration of Biribi, which was brought into fashion by Cardinal Mazarin.

Basset in France
Basset was first introduced into France by Signior Justiniani, ambassador of Venice, in 1674.
The game was very popular at the court of King Charles II, and even after 15 January 1691 when Louis XIV issued an order from the privy council, by which he expressly forbade not only the officers belonging to his army, but likewise all other persons of whatever sex or denomination to play at Hoca, Pharaoh, Barbacole and Basset. The sums of money lost in France at this game were so considerable that the nobility were in danger of being undone after many persons of distinction were ruined. Later the law against gambling was tightened eluding which they disguised Basset under the name of "pour et contre", that is, "for and against".

By the constitution of Basset, large advantages were secured to the tailleur (the dealer / keeper of the bank) and so vast were their gains, that the privilege of keeping a bank at Basset, where the stakes were unlimited, was granted only to cadets or other members of great families. It was basically certain that a considerable fortune could be realised by the tailleur in a short time. The advantages of the dealer arise in many ways, but mainly from the temptations for adventurous players to increase their stakes on certain desperate chances, which rarely turn up, and which in the long run told largely in favour of the bank. Where licenses were otherwise conceded for keeping a public Basset table in France, the stakes were strictly limited to twelve pence.

Basset in England
Basset migrated to England in about 1677, introduced by a croupier called Morin, but never caught on outside Court circles on account of its costliness and the heavy risks it entailed on the players. Its heyday seems to have been in the early 18th century. It has no place in Cotton's 1674 The Complete Gamester, but rates a lengthy entry in the 1721 edition where the fierceness of the gambling is stressed. It is there described as a "French Game", presumably because it was imported from France. The game's high stakes, along with its devastations, is the subject of Susanna Centlivre's 1705 comedy The Basset Table.

The English made Basset quite different from what it was in France where, by royal edict, the public at large were not allowed to play at more than a franc or ten-penny bank, – and the losses or gains could not bring desolation to a family. In England the punters (gamblers) could do as they liked, staking from one guinea to one hundred guineas and more, upon a card. After three or four years, many players had impoverished their families to such an extent that Parliament enacted a prohibition with severe penalties against both games.
 
However, it was "of so bewitching a nature," says our old writer, "by reason of the several multiplications and advantages which it seemingly offered to the unwary punter, that a great many like it so well that they would play at small game rather than give out; and rather than not play at all would punt at six-penny, three-penny, nay, a two-penny bank, – so much did the hope of winning the quinze-et-le-va and the trente-et-le-va intoxicate them."

The Edge
The play in Basset resulted in, basically, a lottery. A player might occasionally win, but the big winner was the dealer (banker).  The dealer had a number of privileges under the rules, including having the sole disposal of the first and last card; this gave them a significant edge.  This was a truth so acknowledged in France that the king ordered, by public edict, that the privilege of a tallière (banker) should be allowed only to the chief cadets (sons of noblemen).  His assumption was that whoever kept the bank must, in a very short time, acquire a considerable fortune.

Game play
The players sat round a table, the talliere (banker/dealer) in the midst of them, with the bank of gold before him, and the punters or players each having a book of 13 cards. Each laid down one, two, three, or more, as they pleased, with money upon them, as stakes. The talliere took the remaining pack in his hand and turned them up, with the bottom card appearing being called the fasse; he then paid half the value of the stakes laid down by the punters upon any card of that sort (rank).

After the fasse was turned up, and the talliere and croupiere (bet collector, similar to a stickman) had looked round the cards on the table, and taken advantage of the money laid on them, the former proceeded with his deal; and the next card appearing, whether the king, queen, ace, or whatever it might be, won for the player (1–1 payout), the latter might receive it, or making paroli (parlay their bet), as before said, go on to sept-et-le-va (7–1 payout).  The card after that won for the talliere, who took money from each player's card of that sort, and brought it into his bank, an obvious and prodigious advantage over the players.

The talliere, if the winning card was a king, and the next after it was a ten, said (showing the cards all round): 'King wins, ten loses,' paying the money to such cards and taking the money from those who lost, adding it to his bank. This done, he went on with the deal: 'Ace wins, five loses; 'Knave (Jack) wins, seven loses;' and so on, every other card alternately winning and losing, till all the pack was dealt but the last card. According to the rules of the game, the last card turned up was for the advantage of the talliere; although a player might have one of the same sort, still it was allowed to him as one of the dues of his office, he paid nothing on it.

The bold player who was lucky and adventurous, and could push on his couch with a considerable stake to sept-et-le-va (7–1 payout), quinze-et-le-va (15–1 payout), trente-et-le-va (30–1 payout), etc., must in a wonderful manner have multiplied his couch, or first stake; but this was seldom done; and the loss of the players, by the very nature of the game, invariably exceeded that of the bank; in fact, this game was altogether in favour of the bank; and yet it is evident that, in spite of this obvious conviction, the game must have been one of the most tempting and fascinating that was ever invented.

Frauds
Of course there were frauds practiced at Basset by the talliere, or banker, in addition to his prescriptive advantages.  The cards might be dealt so as not to allow the punter any winning throughout the pack; and it was in the power of the dealer to let the punter have as many winnings as he thought convenient.

Glossary
By 1870 the game as described in England used a mixture of French and English words and spellings:
The tallière (banker), who laid down a sum of money to answer every winning card which might turn up.
The croupière (assistant of the former), standing by to supervise the losing cards, so that when there were many at play, he might not lose by overlooking anything which might turn up to his profit.
The punter: (in French, ponter – to bet), hence, each player.
The fasse: the first card turned up by the tallière, by which he gained half the value of the money laid upon every card of that sort by the punters or players.
The couch (from couche, stake): which was the first stake that each punter laid upon each card.  Each player had a book of 13 cards before him, upon which he must lay his money.
The paroli (probably from parole, to "give your word" - parlay the bet): whoever won the couch, and intended to go on for another advantage, crooked the corner of his card to indicate he would let his money lie, without being paid the value by the tallière.
The masse: when those who had won the couch, would venture more money on the same card.
The pay:  when the player had won the couch, and, being doubtful of making the paroli, left off; for by going for the pay, if the card turned up wrong, he lost nothing, having won the couch before; but if by this adventure, fortune favoured him, he won double the money he had staked.
The alpieu: when the couch was won by turning up, or crooking, the corner of the winning card.
The sept-et-le-va (seven and the go): the first great chance that showed the advantages of the game, namely, if the player had won the couch, and then made a paroli by crooking the corner of his card, and going on to a second chance, if his winning card turned up again, it became a sept-et-le-va, which was seven times as much as he had laid upon his card.
The quinze-et-le-va (fifteen and the go): attending the player's humour, who, perhaps, was resolved to follow his fancy, and still lay his money upon the same card, which was done by crooking the third corner of his card.  If this card came up by the dealing of the talliere, it made him win 15 (fifteen) times as much money as he staked.
The trent-et-le-va (trente – thirty and the go): marked by the lucky player by crooking the end of the fourth corner of his card, which, coming up, made him win 30 (thirty) times as much money as he staked.
The soissante-et-le-va (soixante -sixty and the go): the highest chance that could happen in the game, for it paid 60 (sixty) times as much money as was staked.  It was seldom won except by some player who pushed his good fortune to the utmost.

Mathematical calculations
Basset has been the object of mathematical calculations. Abraham de Moivre estimated the loss of the punter under any circumstance of cards remaining in the stock when he lays his stake, and of any number of times that his card is repeated in the stock. De Moivre created a table showing the several losses of the punter in whatsoever circumstances he may happen to be. From this table it appears:
That the fewer the cards are in the stock, the greater is the loss of the punter.
That the least loss of the punter, under the same circumstances of cards remaining in the stock, is when the card is but twice in it; the next greater when but three times; still greater when four times; and the greatest when but once. The gain of the banker upon all the money adventured at Basset is 15s 3d. per cent.

See also
 Faro (card game)
Cassino (card game)
The Four False Weapons (a detective fiction by John Dickson Carr)

Notes

Sources

Steinmetz, Andrew (1870) "Chapter X: Piquet, Basset, Faro, Hazard, Passe-dix, Put, Cross and Pile, Thimble-rig" The Gaming Table: Its Votaries and Victims: In all times and countries, especially in England and in France Vol. II, Tinsley Brothers, London, ; online at Project Gutenberg

External links
ap Gwystl, Earl Dafydd "Still more Fifteenth and Sixteenth Century Card Games: Bassett" The Oak (A&S Newsletter of Atlantia) Issue #12, Grey Dragon

16th-century gambling games
Italian gambling games
Banking games